The Palm Serial were 3 successive proprietary 10-pin Serial connectors on the bottom of the first 3 series of models of PDAs from Palm, Inc. to provide serial communications: 1) pre-IrDA models; 2) the 1st IrDA models; 3) the 1st thin, metal-body models.  In addition to Palm's models (and rebranded models like the IBM WorkPad series) similar serial connectors have been used in the Ericsson MC16 Palmtop and Handera equipment.
Pressing the HotSync button located at the base of the cradle closes a circuit between pins 2 and 7 which causes the activation of MUN2214 NPN transistor connected to pin 38 of the Motorola Dragonball CPU that provides a low signal on the IRQ1 UART, triggering the HotSync process.
On pin 8 when a modem connects to the Palm similarly closes a circuit pin 2 to activate another MUN2214 NPN transistor connected to pin 32 (GPIO UART) of the CPU to notify the presence of the modem.

PDA models that used the Palm Serial connector 
 Pilot 1000
 Pilot 5000
 PalmPilot Personal
 PalmPilot Professional
 Palm III
 Palm IIIe
 Palm IIIx
 Palm IIIxe
 Palm VII
 Palm VIIx
 Palm m100
 Palm m105
 TRGpro
 Handera 330
 Symbol 1500
 Symbol 1550

External links 
 PCPD Serial Pin-Out Descriptions
 Palm HotSync(tm) Cradle and serial port information

Palm, Inc.